The 2005 NCAA Division I-AA football rankings are from the Sports Network media poll and the coaches poll.

Legend

The Sports Network poll

Notes

References

Rankings
NCAA Division I FCS football rankings